This is a list of electoral results for the Electoral district of Brown Hill-Ivanhoe in Western Australian state elections.

Members for Brown Hill-Ivanhoe

Election results

Elections in the 1940s

Elections in the 1930s

Elections in the 1920s

Elections in the 1910s

References

Western Australian state electoral results by district